Boende Airport  is an airport serving the town of Boende in Tshuapa Province, Democratic Republic of the Congo.

Airlines and destinations

See also

 List of airports in the Democratic Republic of the Congo
 Transport in the Democratic Republic of the Congo

References

External links
 OpenStreetMap - Boende Airport
 OurAirports - Boende Airport
 FallingRain - Boende Airport
 HERE Maps - Boende
 

Airports in Tshuapa Province